Habia may refer to:

 Habia (bird), a bird genus
 Habia (root), the hydronymic word root